Restless Heart is the title of the first solo album by Christian singer-songwriter Paul Field.

Track listing

Side one
 "Rock with the Best of Them" (Paul Field/Dave Cooke)
 "Radio" (Paul Field/Dave Cooke)
 "Has to be You, Has to be Me" (Paul Field/Dave Cooke)
 "Solo" (Paul Field/Dave Cooke)
 "Positive" (Paul Field/Dave Cooke)
 "The Storm is Over" (Paul Field)

Side two
 "Fairfight" (Paul Field/Dave Cooke)
 "Stranger in Your Eyes" (Paul Field/Dave Cooke)
 "Just Around the Corner" (Paul Field/Dave Cooke)
 "You're the One" (Paul Field)
 "Nearly Midnight" (Paul Field/Dave Cooke)
 "Restless Heart" (Paul Field/Dave Cooke)

Personnel
Paul Field: Vocals, Guitar and Piano
Graham Jarvis: Drums
Mark Griffiths: Bass
Martin Jenner: Guitar
Dave Cooke: Piano, Keyboards,  Guitar and Backing vocals
Luís Jardim: Bass
Linda Jardim: Backing vocals
Marilyn David: Backing vocals
Tom Blades: Guitar
Colin Larne: Drums
Bill Thorpe: Violin
Martin David: Percussion
Barry de Souza: Drums
Ray Russell: Guitar
Henry Lowther: Horn
Nick Pentelow: Saxophone
Nick Firkle: Trumpet
Steve Jones: Violin
Penny Thompson: Viola
Jan Sharpe: Cello

Production notes
Produced by Paul Field and Dave Cooke
Recorded at Riverside Studios

1982 debut albums
Paul Field (Christian singer) albums